Sean Riley (born August 17, 1974) is a former American football offensive specialist who played six seasons in the Arena Football League (AFL) with the Milwaukee Mustangs, Grand Rapids Rampage, Las Vegas Gladiators and Orlando Predators. He played college football at Western Michigan University.

Professional career
Riley played for the Milwaukee Mustangs of the AFL from 1999 to 2001, earning Second-team All-Arena and AFL All-Ironman Team honors in 2000. He was selected by the San Jose SaberCats in the 2001 AFL Dispersal Draft. He was placed on the other league exempt list on January 21, 2002. Riley spent time with the New York Giants of the National Football League during the 2002 off-season. He was released before the start of the season. He was selected by the Grand Rapids Rampage in the 2002 AFL Expansion Draft. Riley was released by the Rampage on February 13, 2003. He signed with the AFL's Las Vegas Gladiators February 20, 2003. He was signed by the Orlando Predators of the AFL on March 3, 2004.

References

External links
Just Sports Stats
College stats

Living people
1974 births
American football wide receivers
Western Michigan Broncos football players
Milwaukee Mustangs (1994–2001) players
San Jose SaberCats players
New York Giants players
Grand Rapids Rampage players
Las Vegas Gladiators players
Orlando Predators players
Players of American football from Houston